The 19th Vuelta a España (Tour of Spain), a long-distance bicycle stage race and one of the three grand tours, was held from 30 April to 16 May 1964. José Pérez Francés won the points classification and Julio Jiménez won the mountains classification.

Teams and riders

Route

Results

References

External links
La Vuelta (Official site in Spanish, English, and French)

 
1964 in road cycling
1964
1964 in Spanish sport
1964 Super Prestige Pernod